Unabiara collaris is a species of beetle in the family Cerambycidae, the only species in the genus Unabiara.

References

Heteropsini